Donnarumma is an Italian surname. Notable people with the surname include:

 Alfredo Donnarumma (born 1990), Italian football second striker
 Antonio Donnarumma (born 1990), Italian football goalkeeper
 Gianluigi Donnarumma (born 1999), Italian football goalkeeper
 Marco Donnarumma (born 1984), Italian performance and media artist

Italian-language surnames